Jane Sanderson (born 17 August 1962) is a Scottish curler and curling coach.

Teams

Women's

Mixed

Record as a coach of national teams

Awards
Scottish Disability Sports Awards - Fife Trophy - Coach of the Year Award: 2004

References

External links

History - British Curling (look at "Olympic Games - Women; 1998 Nagano, JPN")

Living people
1962 births
Scottish female curlers
Scottish curling champions
Scottish curling coaches